The 1963 Old Dominion 500 was a NASCAR Grand National Series event that was held on September 22, 1963, at Martinsville Speedway in Martinsville, Virginia.

Background
Martinsville Speedway is one of five short tracks to hold NASCAR races. The track's turns are banked at eleven degrees, while the front stretch, the location of the finish line, is banked at zero degrees. The back stretch also has a zero degree banking.

Race report
The race was scheduled for 500 laps; taking three hours and forty-two minutes to complete. Fred Lorenzen defeated Marvin Panch by a single lap and two seconds. Twenty thousand people came to witness three lead changes and five cautions for eighteen laps.

Jimmy Massey became the last-place finisher after having to drop out prior to the race due to a terminal crash with Jimmy Pardue. Jack Anderson pulled out of the race on lap 13 after dealing with a faulty head gasket in his vehicle. An oil leak would take Bobby Keck out of the action on lap 26. A faulty vehicle bearing forced Perk Brown out of the race on lap 43. Problems with the vehicles' brakes would force Major Melton and Fred Harb to retire from the race.

Perk Brown and Major Melton would end their NASCAR Grand National Series careers after the conclusion of this race.

Most of the car owners that were involved in the race were independents and had no affiliation with a multi-car team. This race still holds the record for the fewest leaders in a NASCAR Cup Series race at Martinsville along with the 1961 Old Dominion 500, the 1965 Old Dominion 500 and the 1976 Old Dominion 500. Individual winnings for this race were as low as $100 ($ when adjusted for inflation) and as high as $3,800 ($ when adjusted for inflation).

At least nine notable crew chiefs attended this race; including Ray Fox, Herman Beam, Glen Wood and Herb Nab.

The transition to purpose-built racecars began in the early 1960s and occurred gradually over that decade.  Changes made to the sport by the late 1960s brought an end to the "strictly stock" vehicles of the 1950s.

Timeline
Section reference: 
 Start of race: Junior Johnson had the pole position to begin the event, two drivers would crash into each other before the first official lap.
 Lap 13: The head gasket on Jack Anderson's vehicle came off.
 Lap 26: An oil leak from Bobby Keck's vehicle forced him to leave to track as not to endanger his fellow drivers.
 Lap 41: A bearing came off Perk Brown's vehicle, forcing him to accept a 32nd-place finish.
 Lap 52: Fred Lorenzen took over the lead from Junior Johnson.
 Lap 53: Junior Johnson took over the lead from Fred Lorenzen.
 Lap 81: Fred Lorenzen took over the lead from Junior Johnson.
 Lap 82: The hub on J.D. McDuffie's vehicle broke off, denying him yet another NASCAR Cup Series victory.
 Lap 101: The ball joint on Bill Widenhouse's vehicle became non-functional.
 Lap 130: The valve on Roy Tyner's vehicle somehow became problematic.
 Lap 183: Rex White had a terminal crash, causing him not to finish the race.
 Lap 211: Al White managed to overheat his vehicle from high speed stock car racing.
 Lap 296: Junior Johnson had a terminal crash, ending his race a bit too soon.
 Lap 300: Larry Frank's vehicle managed to overheat while racing.
 Lap 362: Ned Jarrett's engine became problematic, ending his race weekend early.
 Lap 430: Reb Wickersham had a terminal crash, forcing him to leave the race prematurely.
 Finish: Fred Lorenzen was officially declared the winner of the event.

Qualifying

Failed to qualify: Bobby Keck (#57), Possum Jones (#05)

Top 20 finishers

References

Old Dominion 500
Old Dominion 500
NASCAR races at Martinsville Speedway